The New England Center for Circus Arts (NECCA) is a non-profit circus school based in Brattleboro, Vermont. As of 2016, the School reported 6,000 students.

Originally in the Old Cotton Mill, in Brattleboro, the school moved into a new custom-built facility at 10 Town Crier Dr in 2017, which includes an 8,600 square foot Trapezium. The new facility required a 2.5 million dollar capital campaign, and was designed by Turner Brooks Architects. The school had been growing continuously since its inception in 2007. The school was founded by Serenity Smith Forchion and Elsie Smith.

References 

Circus schools
Buildings and structures in Brattleboro, Vermont
2007 establishments in Vermont